Rosscahill is a village in County Galway, Ireland.

References

Towns and villages in County Galway